Thomas Alastair Sutherland Ogilvie ('Taso') Mathieson (25 July 1908, Glasgow – 12 October 1991, Vichy), stylised as T.A.S.O. Mathieson and sometimes referred to as Donald Mathieson, was a British racing driver and author of automotive history books.

Racing career and personal life
'Taso' was the son of Thomas Ogilvie Mathieson. His family owned the Scottish hand tool manufacturing company Alexander Mathieson & Sons.

'Taso' Mathieson started racing in 1930, when he entered a race at Brooklands restricted to Lagondas. He established his first victory during an Easter Bank-Holiday BARC Open Meeting on 28 March 1932, driving a supercharged Officine Meccaniche. Over the next two years, he won three races in his Bugatti and broke the lap record for 2-litre cars at Snaefell Mountain Course on the Isle of Man, with an average speed of 72.15 mph (116.11 km/h).

Because of health problems, Mathieson was unable to enter any races from 1934 to 1937, so his Bugatti was driven a few times by Chris Staniland. In 1938 and 1939 he entered the 24 Hours of Le Mans, but both times retired before the finish.

Mathieson was one of the first, if not the first, Briton to race again in Continental Europe after World War II, racing an ex-Henry Birkin 3-litre Maserati in 1946. On 30 May, he raced in the Coupe de la Résistance and retired with an oil leak. He entered the Grand Prix des Frontières on 9 June, but instead raced at the René le Bègue Cup held on the same day, finishing fifth. On 16 June, he attended the Belgian Grand Prix in Brussels, but did not start. He placed sixth in the Roussillon Grand Prix on 30 June, and on 28 July he raced in the Nantes Grand Prix, retiring with engine troubles.

Mathieson entered an ERA E-Type with Leslie Johnson as driver, for 1949 Richmond Trophy, Jersey Road Race and British Empire Trophy, as well as the 1950 British Grand Prix. Some sources attribute these as official ERA entries because Johnson had purchased the car manufacturer three years before. Mathieson bought a 2-litre Frazer Nash Le Mans in which he scored a class victory in the 1950 24 Hours of Le Mans together with Richard "Dickie" Stoop.

He continued racing until 1955, mostly entering Grands Prix in France. When he was injured in a traffic or racing accident, he was forced to retire. After 25 years of racing, Mathieson concentrated on his writing and his collection of photographs, together with his wife Mila Parély, a French actress he had married in 1947. He wrote various authoritative books, including Grand Prix Racing 1906-1914, and wrote several articles in the French magazine Le Fanauto in 1979 and 1980.

Racing results

 Mathieson was the team owner, not a driver.
† Pierre Maréchal was killed in an accident.

Complete 24 Hours of Le Mans results

Complete Targa Florio results

Bibliography

External links
T.A.S.O. Mathieson at racingsportscars.com.

References

1908 births
1991 deaths
Scottish racing drivers
Sportspeople from Glasgow
Scottish sports journalists
Scottish expatriates in France
Grand Prix drivers